Rank comparison chart of all air forces of the European Union member states.

Officers (OF 1–10)

See also
Comparative air force enlisted ranks of the European Union
Military rank
Comparative army officer ranks of the European Union
Comparative army enlisted ranks of the European Union
Comparative navy officer ranks of the European Union
Comparative navy enlisted ranks of the European Union
Ranks and insignia of NATO air forces officers
Comparative air force officer ranks of Europe

Notes

References

Europe
Air force ranks
Military comparisons